Larry Darby (born 1957) is a practicing attorney in Montgomery, Alabama. He was runner-up candidate for Alabama Attorney-General in the 2006 Democratic Party Primary. Darby's campaign ran into controversy and gained momentum when he questioned the veracity and scale of the Holocaust.

Background and education 
Larry Darby was born in 1957 in Conecuh County, Alabama.  Darby's ancestors have been in Alabama since the early 19th century. He earned his BS degree at the University of Alabama, his MBA degree at Auburn University and Doctor of Jurisprudence degree at Faulkner University's Thomas Goode Jones School of Law. Darby now works as an evictions attorney in Montgomery, AL (http://www.alabamaevictions.com).
Darby is the Chairman of the Alabama Capital Region Chapter of the Council of Conservative Citizens.
Darby is Commander of the Confederate Constitution Camp 2143 of the Sons of Confederate Veterans. Darby was abandoned by Nazis after he admitted that his wife was Chinese, and his claims that his two half-Chinese daughters shared his views were dismissed (https://www.splcenter.org/fighting-hate/intelligence-report/2006/alabama-candidate-attacks-jews-nazis-hate-him-anyway). Darby now runs the Larry Darby Law Firm in Montgomery, which mainly handles eviction cases.

Politics 
Larry Darby, in his first run for public office, was the runner-up candidate for Alabama Attorney-General in the 2006 Democratic Primary.  Darby garnered 43% of the vote, carrying 33 of 67 Alabama counties. 
The Darby campaign attracted attention when he questioned the number of Jews who died during the Third Reich, placing the number around 140,000 suggesting that many of those succumbed to typhus. The Associated Press quoted him as saying, "I am what the propagandists call a Holocaust denier, but I do not deny mass deaths that included some Jews," and "there was no systematic extermination of Jews.  There's no evidence of that at all." Darby attributed the claims of millions of deaths in the Holocaust to the "Holocaust Industry." He also spoke positively of David Irving and attended a meeting of the group National Vanguard. Darby also expressed anti-immigration views, declaring that the United States was undergoing a "Mexican invasion" and compared the current immigration to the Civil Rights Movement, seeing them both as events which have hurt the South.

During the Alabama Ten Commandments dispute Darby promoted the constitutional principle of separation between religion and government.  Darby also supported Judge Moore's early argument that the federal government had no jurisdiction over this matter.  He opposed the placement of what he called "a monument to Jewish law" in a government building and saw it as an attempt to send the message that "Jewish Supremacism is the law" despite several Jewish organizations coming out against the placement of the commandments because they flouted the separation of church and state when placed in a judicial building.

Darby is a former atheist and the founder of the Atheist Law Center  as well as being the former state director of American Atheists. Larry Darby is also an advocate for the decriminalization of marijuana.

After his surprising showing in the 2006 AG election, Darby publicly lobbied for the Alabama state Democratic Party leadership to replace the candidates who were running as Democrats in the 2008 gubernatorial election with him, claiming he was the only Democrat with a legitimate chance to be elected. The state's Democratic leadership responded in turn by publicly stating that they disavowed Darby and his beliefs and said they would not put him forward for any public office in the future; he was not expelled from the party or officially banned from any activities there, as it was assumed (correctly) that his reaction to being told he was unwelcome would be for him to depart on his own. Darby lashed out against the leadership for "censorship" but saw his political career completely evaporate since that time.

See also
 Holocaust denial

References 

Living people
1957 births
Alabama lawyers
Former atheists and agnostics
People from Conecuh County, Alabama
Politicians from Montgomery, Alabama
University of Alabama alumni
Auburn University alumni
Faulkner University alumni
Converts to Christianity
Alabama Democrats
Council of Conservative Citizens
American Holocaust deniers
Lawyers from Montgomery, Alabama